Indians in the United States may refer to:
Indian Americans, people of Indian ancestry resident in the United States
Native Americans in the United States, also known as American Indians